Charcé-Saint-Ellier-sur-Aubance is a former French commune located in the department of Maine-et-Loire, in area Pays de la Loire. On 15 December 2016, it was merged into the new commune Brissac Loire Aubance.

The town was born in 1973 from the merger of the former municipalities of Charcé and Saint-Ellier.

Geography 
Charcé-Saint-Ellier-sur-Aubance is located a few kilometers east of Brissac-Quince.

See also
Communes of the Maine-et-Loire department

References

Charcesaintelliersuraubance